The Looney Tunes Golden Collection is a series of six four-disc DVD box sets from Warner Home Video, each containing about 60 Looney Tunes and Merrie Melodies animated shorts. The series began on October 28, 2003, and ended on October 21, 2008.

Overview
The Golden Collection series was launched following the success of the Walt Disney Treasures series which collected archived Disney material.

These collections were made possible after the merger of Time Warner (which owned the color cartoons released from August 1, 1948, onward, as well as the black-and-white Looney Tunes, the post-Harman/Ising black-and-white Merrie Melodies and the first H/I Merrie Melodies entry Lady, Play Your Mandolin!) and Turner Broadcasting System (which owned the color cartoons released prior to August 1, 1948, and the remaining Harman/Ising Merrie Melodies; most of these cartoons had been released as part of The Golden Age of Looney Tunes laserdisc series), along with the subsequent transfer of video rights to the Turner library from MGM Home Entertainment to Warner Home Video.

The cartoons included on the set are uncut, unedited, uncensored, and digitally restored and remastered from the original black-and-white and successive exposure Technicolor film negatives (or, in the case of the Cinecolor shorts, the Technicolor reprints). However, some of the cartoons in these collections are derived from the "Blue Ribbon" reissues (altered from their original versions with their revised front-and-end credit sequences), as the original titles for these cartoons are presumably lost. Where the original titles, instead of the "Blue Ribbon" titles, still exist, Warner has taken the "Blue Ribbon" titles out.

A handful of cartoons in the first two collections and the bonus cartoons on Volume 6 have digital video noise reduction (DVNR) artifacting. The noise reduction process sometimes unintentionally erases or blurs some of the picture on certain scenes of the cartoons, which has caused controversy among some Looney Tunes fans. The most recent collections, however, lack such artifacting. Since August 2007, Warner Bros. Home Video has been quietly reissuing copies of the fourth disc of Volume 2 that lacks artifacting and interlacing because of numerous complaints by consumers.

Beginning with Volume 3, a warning was printed on the packaging explaining that the collection is intended for adults and the content may not be suitable for children (except for Volume 6, which states that it isn't suitable for children). This goes along with Whoopi Goldberg's filmed introduction in Volume 3 which explains the history of ethnic imagery that frequently appears in cartoons of the 1930s and 1940s. Beginning with Volume 4, a singular disclaimer text card similar to Goldberg's spoken disclaimer precedes each disc's main menu. This is seen on the Tom and Jerry Spotlight Collection discs and even on the back of the Woody Woodpecker and Friends Classic Cartoon Collection discs (though for the latter, they are from Universal, not Warner Bros.).

The DVDs also feature several special features including interviews/documentaries of the people behind the cartoons such as Friz Freleng, Bob Clampett, Tex Avery, Robert McKimson, Chuck Jones, musical conductor Carl Stalling and voice-artist Mel Blanc, pencil tests, and audio commentaries by animation historians Jerry Beck, Michael Barrier and Greg Ford, as well as current animators Paul Dini, Eric Goldberg and John Kricfalusi and voice actors Stan Freberg and June Foray. In addition to the appearances by the above-mentioned, there is interview footage of Stan Freberg, June Foray, Noel Blanc, Billy West, Keith Scott, Mark Evanier, Bob Bergen, Joe Alaskey, Bill Melendez, Willie Ito, Corny Cole, Peter Alvarado and the children of the various directors: Robert McKimson, Jr., Ruth Clampett, Sybil Freleng and Linda Jones. Audio footage of Mel Blanc in recording sessions is heard as a bonus feature on several of the discs, as is an obscure audio clip of Arthur Q. Bryan rehearsing a line as Elmer Fudd in What's Opera, Doc?. In total, there are 356 cartoons (18 more than The Golden Age of Looney Tunes) spread throughout the six volumes.

In some regions, such as Regions 2 and 4, each disc in each volume is packaged (or re-packaged) separately. In this format, it was titled "Looney Tunes Collection" omitting 'Golden' from the title. There were no boxes to group the various volumes, and no numbering on the spine of each individual cover, so storage order was not easily maintained.
The Region 1 box set has since been released in Regions 2 and 4.

Releases

Volume 1
Volume 1 (released on October 28, 2003) contains 56 cartoons (all in color) mostly from the 1950s with a smaller selection of shorts from the 1940s.  Popular shorts include:
Baseball Bugs
Rabbit Seasoning
Bully for Bugs
Long-Haired Hare
High Diving Hare
Rabbit of Seville
Duck Amuck
The Scarlet Pumpernickel
Rabbit Fire
Duck Dodgers in the 24½th Century
Hair-Raising Hare
Fast and Furry-ous
For Scent-imental Reasons
Feed the Kitty
Bugs Bunny Gets the Boid
Tortoise Wins by a Hare
Speedy Gonzales
The Foghorn Leghorn
Devil May Hare

Disc-by-disc breakdown
Disc one is dedicated to Bugs Bunny
Disc two is dedicated to Daffy Duck and Porky Pig
Discs three and four consist of an assortment of shorts featuring other characters, grouped by director: Chuck Jones and Bob Clampett on disc three, Friz Freleng and Robert McKimson on disc four

Volume 2
Volume 2 (released on November 2, 2004) contains a broader selection of cartoons from the 1930s, 1940s, and 1950s, including:
The Big Snooze
Broomstick Bunny
Bugs Bunny Rides Again
The Heckling Hare
Little Red Riding Rabbit
Tortoise Beats Hare
Baby Buggy Bunny
Beep, Beep
Stop! Look! And Hasten!
Gee Whiz-z-z-z-z-z-z
The Dover Boys
Mouse Wreckers
A Bear for Punishment
Bad Ol' Putty Tat
Gift Wrapped
Ain't She Tweet
Tweetie Pie
Kitty Kornered
Baby Bottleneck
Old Glory
The Great Piggy Bank Robbery
Porky in Wackyland
Back Alley Oproar
Book Revue
A Corny Concerto
I Love to Singa
Three Little Bops
One Froggy Evening
Show Biz Bugs
What's Opera, Doc?
You Ought to Be in Pictures
This is the first volume to have 60 cartoons, which would continue to be the "standard" number in later volumes (though most would also include additional "bonus" cartoons).

Disc-by-disc breakdown
Disc one, as in the first edition, contains only Bugs Bunny cartoons.
Disc two contains Road Runner and Wile E. Coyote shorts, along with four cartoons from Road Runner and Wile E. Coyote creator Chuck Jones.
Disc three contains nine Sylvester/Tweety shorts, along with six cartoons starring Daffy Duck and/or Porky Pig.
Disc four is an all-stars disc, though there is some relation between each cartoon on the disc: they are either musicals, Hollywood parodies, set on a stage, or incorporate other forms of show business.

Volume 3
Volume 3 (released on October 25, 2005) contains a selection of cartoons (52 in color, 8 in black-and-white) mostly from the 1930s and 1940s, but with some from the 1950s and 1960s including such popular shorts as:
A Hare Grows in Manhattan
Hillbilly Hare
Duck! Rabbit, Duck!
Thugs with Dirty Mugs
Swooner Crooner
I Haven't Got a Hat
Porky's Romance
Porky's Party
Porky in Egypt
Pigs in a Polka
Porky Pig's Feat
Robin Hood Daffy
Claws for Alarm
Super-Rabbit
A Gruesome Twosome
Draftee Daffy
Falling Hare
Birds Anonymous
An Itch in Time
Odor-able Kitty
Walky Talky Hawky

Disc-by-disc breakdown
Disc one, as with previous volumes, is only Bugs Bunny.
Disc two features Hollywood caricatures and parodies.
Disc three mainly concerns Porky Pig, with a few other pig-related cartoons thrown in.
Disc four is the all-stars disc.

Volume 4
Volume 4 (released on November 14, 2006) contains selections (51 in color and 9 in black and white) ranging from 1936 to 1966 (the latest Looney Tunes cartoon yet), including such popular shorts as:
Rabbit Hood
Operation: Rabbit
Mississippi Hare
8 Ball Bunny
Knighty Knight Bugs
The Case of the Stuttering Pig
Plane Daffy
Puss N' Booty
The Stupid Cupid
Cat-Tails For Two
Mexicali Shmoes
The Pied Piper of Guadalupe
The Night Watchman
The Aristo-Cat
Dough Ray Me-ow
Mouse and Garden

Disc-by-disc breakdown
Disc one continues the tradition of the only-Bugs Bunny disc.
Disc two is dedicated to director Frank Tashlin.
Disc three contains only Speedy Gonzales cartoons.
Disc four consists of cartoons starring obscure Looney Tunes cats, with a few Sylvester cartoons thrown in for good measure.

Volume 5
Volume 5 (released on October 30, 2007) contains 41 color cartoons and 19 black-and-white cartoons (the most of any set thus far), including such popular shorts as:

Ali Baba Bunny
Buccaneer Bunny
A Pest in the House
Stupor Duck
The Stupor Salesman
The Abominable Snow Rabbit
You Were Never Duckier
Bewitched Bunny
The Bear's Tale
Goldimouse and the Three Cats
Little Red Walking Hood
The Trial of Mr. Wolf
Buckaroo Bugs
Hare Ribbin'
The Old Grey Hare
The Wise Quacking Duck
The Daffy Doc
A Tale of Two Kitties
Eatin' on the Cuff
Porky at the Crocadero
Scrap Happy Daffy
Gold Diggers of '49
Porky's Preview
Wholly Smoke

Disc-by-disc breakdown
Disc one features Bugs Bunny and Daffy Duck. This is the first time that the first disc is not entirely dedicated to Bugs Bunny, now sharing the spotlight with Daffy Duck.
Disc two contains parodies of fairy tale stories, mostly of Little Red Riding Hood.
Disc three honors the work of director Bob Clampett.
Disc four features Porky Pig and other early classics - all in black-and-white (the first such disc in the LTGC).

Volume 6
Volume 6 (released on October 21, 2008) concludes the entire series of the Golden Collection. The ratio of color to black-and-white cartoons (41 to 19) is the same as the previous volume. This volume contains such popular shorts as:
Hare Trigger
Crowing Pains
My Favorite Duck
Satan's Waitin'
Bear Feat
Dog Gone South
A Ham in a Role
Herr Meets Hare
Russian Rhapsody
The Draft Horse
The Ducktators
Horton Hatches the Egg
Fresh Airedale
Chow Hound
Rocket-Bye Baby
Much Ado About Nutting
The Hole Idea
Now Hear This
Page Miss Glory

Disc-by-disc breakdown

Disc one features an all-star collection.
Disc two features cartoons with a World War II theme (and possibly World War I in the case of Bosko the Doughboy).
Disc three features early 1930s black and white cartoons that star Bosko, Buddy and other characters.
Disc four features a collection of one-shots.

Re-release
On December 27, 2011, Warner re-packaged all volumes in a single pack.

Other DVD releases of Looney Tunes

Looney Tunes: Spotlight Collection

Concurrently with the Golden Collections, Warner Home Video also released the Looney Tunes: Spotlight Collection, each volume of which packaged half of the cartoons of a Golden Collection, on two DVDs. The exception to this practice was in 2005, with Warner Home Video instead releasing the somewhat-misnamed Looney Tunes Movie Collection, which featured DVDs containing The Bugs Bunny/Road Runner Movie and Bugs Bunny's 3rd Movie: 1001 Rabbit Tales.

Looney Tunes Super Stars

In November 2009, it was reported that two new single-disc DVD releases, with 15 cartoons each, would be released in April 2010. It was also reported that these 30 cartoons would not contain any duplicates that had already been released as part of the Looney Tunes Golden Collection releases. This series of DVDs is called Looney Tunes Super Stars and the first two titles are Bugs Bunny: Hare Extraordinaire and Daffy Duck: Frustrated Fowl. These new DVDs still have the cartoons digitally restored and remastered - in addition to being shown uncut and uncensored. A second set of Looney Tunes Super Stars DVDs was released on November 30, 2010. The titles in the second wave are Foghorn Leghorn & Friends: Barnyard Bigmouth and Tweety & Sylvester: Feline Fwenzy (which featured a collection of 15 previously-on-DVD shorts).

Some viewers noted discs of the first wave proved to be cropped and distorted and otherwise poorly restored to present the shorts in "widescreen" as opposed to their original aspect ratio (though these were just for the post-1953 shorts). Warner Bros. stated the reason for this was that all post-1953 WB shorts were shown in matted-widescreen in theaters.

On December 1, 2010, animation expert Jerry Beck explained on the Shokus Internet Radio call-in talk program, Stu's Show that Warner aimed this series not at collectors, but at the mass market who expect it to fit on their widescreen TVs.  He speculated that at some point down the road there will probably be a double-dip release of those shorts in a collector's DVD version with the video in fullscreen format. However, the Foghorn Leghorn disc contains both the matted-widescreen versions and the original fullscreen (and will most likely continue for future waves featuring new-to-DVD shorts). Jerry Beck stated on Stu's Show on December 1, 2010 that 2011 would see new Super Stars releases, such as a release titled Road Runner and Wile E. Coyote (which features new-to-DVD shorts), another Sylvester release titled Sylvester and Hippety Hopper (with more new-to-DVD shorts) and another Bugs release (with double dips).

Looney Tunes Platinum Collection

Another new series, Looney Tunes Platinum Collection, was released on Blu-ray. The first volume was released on November 15, 2011. A 2-disc DVD version of the Platinum Collection was made available on July 3, 2012. The first two discs overlap with releases from the Golden and Super Stars collections. Two more volumes were released on Blu-ray and DVD in the following years.

Porky Pig 101

In 2017, Warner Archive released a 5-disc DVD set featuring the first 101 cartoons of Porky Pig's filmography.

Bugs Bunny 80th Anniversary Collection

In 2020, Warner Home Video released a 3-Disc Blu-ray Disc set collecting 60 Bugs Bunny cartoons, all digitally restored in HD, including 40 cartoons previously unavailable on DVD or Blu-ray Disc.

Available shorts

This is a listing of the shorts in the Warner Bros.' Looney Tunes and Merrie Melodies series currently available on the Looney Tunes Golden Collections, and its successors, Looney Tunes Super Stars, Looney Tunes Mouse Chronicles: The Chuck Jones Collection, The Essential Bugs Bunny and The Essential Daffy Duck. A new series has made it to Blu-ray Disc with the Looney Tunes Platinum Collection. In addition Warner Archive released Porky Pig 101 which contained all 99 black and white Porky Pig cartoons. Also in 2020 Warner Home Video released Bugs Bunny 80th Anniversary Collection which contained several newly restored shorts that were previously unavailable on DVD or Blu-ray Disc. This list also provides shorts included as bonus cartoons on miscellaneous DVDs.

Key

  = Looney Tunes
  = Merrie Melodies
  = was reissued as a Blue Ribbon Merrie Melodie
 NT = Non-theatrical shorts
 X:Y = Volume X, Disc Y (NR if unrestored and/or included only among special features)
 GC = Looney Tunes Golden Collection
 PC = Looney Tunes Platinum Collection
 BB = Looney Tunes Super Stars' Bugs Bunny: Hare Extraordinaire
 DD = Looney Tunes Super Stars' Daffy Duck: Frustrated Fowl
 FL = Looney Tunes Super Stars' Foghorn Leghorn & Friends: Barnyard Bigmouth
 SH = Looney Tunes Super Stars' Road Runner and Wile E. Coyote: Supergenius Hijinks
 PLP = Looney Tunes Super Stars' Pepe Le Pew: Zee Best of Zee Best
 PP = Looney Tunes Super Stars' Porky & Friends: Hilarious Ham
 FF = Looney Tunes Super Stars' Tweety & Sylvester: Feline Fwenzy
 WW = Looney Tunes Super Stars' Bugs Bunny: Wascally Wabbit
 MM = Looney Tunes Super Stars' Sylvester and Hippety Hopper: Marsupial Mayhem
 MC = Looney Tunes Mouse Chronicles: The Chuck Jones Collection
 EBB = The Essential Bugs Bunny
 EDD = The Essential Daffy Duck
 PP101 = Porky Pig 101
 BB80 = Bugs Bunny 80th Anniversary Collection

 Bosko, the Talk-Ink Kid (Harman and Ising/GC 1:4NR) - 1929
 Sinkin' in the Bathtub (Harman and Ising/Apr/GC 3:2NR) - 1930
 Congo Jazz (Harman and Ising/Sep/GC 6:3) - 1930
 The Booze Hangs High (Harman and Ising/Nov/GC 6:3) - 1930
 Lady, Play Your Mandolin! (Ising/GC 1:3NR) - 1931
 Smile, Darn Ya, Smile! (Ising/Sep 5/GC 6:3) - 1931
 One More Time (Ising/Oct 3/GC 6:3) - 1931
 Bosko the Doughboy (Harman/Oct 17/GC 6:2) - 1931
 You Don't Know What You're Doin'! (Ising/Oct 31/GC 6:3) - 1931
 It's Got Me Again! (Harman and Ising/May 14/GC 3:2NR) - 1932
 Moonlight for Two (Harman and Ising/Jun 11/Forbidden Hollywood Vol. 3) - 1932
 I Love a Parade (Ising/GC 6:3) - 1932
 Ride Him, Bosko! (Harman/Sep 17/GC 6:3) - 1932
 The Shanty Where Santy Claus Lives (Rudy Ising/Jan. 7/Lady Killer DVD)-1933
 One Step Ahead of My Shadow (Rudolf Ising, Feb. 4/Forbidden Hollywood Vol. 3)-1933
 Bosko in Person (Harman and Freleng/Feb 11/GC 6:3) - 1933
 Young and Healthy (Rudy Ising/March 4/Footlight Parade DVD)-1933
 The Organ Grinder (Rudy Ising/April 8/Mayor of Hell DVD)-1933
 Wake Up the Gypsy in Me (Rudy Ising/May 13/Picture Snatcher DVD)-1933
 I Like Mountain Music (Ising/GC 6:3) - 1933
 Shuffle Off to Buffalo (Ising/Jul 8/GC 6:3) - 1933
 Bosko's Mechanical Man (Harman/Jul 29/Morning Glory DVD)-1933
 The Dish Ran Away with the Spoon (Ising/Aug 5/6:3) - 1933
 Bosko's Picture Show (Harman and Freleng/Aug 26/GC 6:3) - 1933
 We're in the Money (Ising/Aug 26/GC 6:3) - 1933
 Buddy's Day Out (Palmer/Sep 9/GC 6:3) - 1933
 I've Got to Sing a Torch Song (Palmer/Sep 23/GC 5:4) - 1933
 Sittin' on a Backyard Fence (Duvall/GC 6:3) - 1933
 Buddy's Beer Garden (Duvall/Nov 18/GC 6:3) - 1933
 Pettin' in the Park (Brown/Jan. 27/Gold Diggers of 1933 DVD)-1934
 Honeymoon Hotel (Duvall/Feb 27/Footlight Parade DVD)-1934
 How Do I Know It's Sunday (Freleng/GC 6:3) - 1934
 Buddy's Circus (King/Aug 25/GC 6:3) - 1934
 Shake Your Powder Puff (Freleng/9-29/The Gay Divorcee DVD)-1934
 Those Beautiful Dames (Freleng/11-10/Dames DVD)-1934
 I Haven't Got a Hat (Freleng/Mar 9/GC 3:3/PP101) - 1935
 Into Your Dance (Freleng/Jun 8/Annie Oakley DVD)-1935
 The Country Mouse (Freleng/Jul 13/MC:2)  - 1935
 Buddy the Gee Man (King/Aug 24/G Men DVD)-1935
 A Cartoonist's Nightmare (King/Sep 14/GC 6:3/PP101) - 1935
 Hollywood Capers (King/Oct 19/GC 3:2) - 1935
 Billboard Frolics (Freleng/11-09/Captain Blood DVD)-1935
 Gold Diggers of '49 (Avery/Nov 2/GC 5:4/PP101) - 1935
 Boom Boom (King/Feb 29/PP101)- 1936
 Page Miss Glory (Avery/Mar 7/GC 6:4/PC 2:2) - 1936
 Alpine Antics (King/Mar 9/GC 5:4/PP101) - 1936
 The Blow Out (Avery/Apr 4/PP101) - 1936
 Westward Whoa (King/Apr 25/PP101) - 1936
 Plane Dippy (Avery/Apr 30/PP101) - 1936
 Fish Tales (King/May 23/PP101) - 1936
 Shanghaied Shipmates (King/Jun 20/PP101) - 1936
 Porky's Pet (King/Jul 11/PP101) - 1936
 I Love to Singa (Avery/Jul 18/GC 2:4/PC 1:2) - 1936
 Porky the Rain-Maker (Avery/Aug 1/PP101) - 1936
 Porky's Poultry Plant (Tashlin/Aug 22/GC 4:2/PP101) - 1936
 Milk and Money (Avery/Oct 3/GC 5:4/PP101) - 1936
 Porky's Moving Day (King/Oct 7/PP101) - 1936
 Little Beau Porky (Tashlin/Nov 14/GC 4:2/PP101) - 1936
 The Coo-Coo Nut Grove (Freleng/Nov 28/GC 3:2) - 1936
 The Village Smithy (Avery/Dec 5/PP101) - 1936
 Porky in the North Woods (Tashlin/Dec 19/GC 4:2/PP101) - 1936
 Porky the Wrestler (Avery/Jan 9/PP101) - 1937
 Pigs Is Pigs (Freleng/Jan 30/GC 3:3)  - 1937
 Porky's Road Race (Tashlin/Feb 6/GC 3:2/PP101) - 1937
 Picador Porky (Avery/Feb 27/PP101) - 1937
 Porky's Romance (Tashlin/Apr 3/GC 3:3/PP101) - 1937
 She Was an Acrobat's Daughter (Freleng/Apr 10/GC 3:2) - 1937
 Porky's Duck Hunt (Avery/Apr 17/EDD/PP101) - 1937
 Porky and Gabby (Iwerks/May 15/PP101) - 1937
 Porky's Building (Tashlin/Jun 19/PP101) - 1937
 Porky's Super Service (Iwerks/Jul 3/PP101) - 1937
 Porky's Badtime Story (Iwerks/Jul 24/PP101) - 1937
 Porky's Railroad (Tashlin/Aug 7/GC 4:2/PP101) - 1937
 Get Rich Quick Porky (Clampett/Aug 28/PP101) - 1937
 Speaking of the Weather (Tashlin/Sep 4/GC 3:2) - 1937
 Porky's Garden (Avery/Sep 11/PP101) - 1937
 Rover's Rival (Clampett/Oct 9/PP101) - 1937
 The Lyin' Mouse (Freleng/Oct 16/MC:2) - 1937
 The Case of the Stuttering Pig (Tashlin/Oct 30/GC 4:2/PP101) - 1937
 Little Red Walking Hood (Avery/Nov 6/GC 5:2) - 1937
 Porky's Double Trouble (Tashlin/Nov 13/GC 5:4/PP101) - 1937
 The Woods Are Full of Cuckoos (Tashlin/Dec 4/GC 3:2) - 1937
 Porky's Hero Agency (Clampett/Dec 4/PP101) - 1937
 Daffy Duck & Egghead (Avery/Jan 1/GC 3:4/EDD) - 1938
 Porky's Poppa (Clampett/Jan 15/GC 5:4/PP101) - 1938
 Porky at the Crocadero (Tashlin/Feb 5/GC 5:4/PP101) - 1938
 What Price Porky (Clampett/Feb 26/GC 5:4/PP101) - 1938
 Porky's Phoney Express (Howard & Dalton/Mar 19/PP101) - 1938
 Porky's Five & Ten (Clampett/Apr 16/PP101) - 1938
 Porky's Hare Hunt (Hardaway/April 30/PC 2:2/PP101) - 1938
 Now That Summer is Gone (Tashlin/May 14/GC 4:2)  - 1938
 Injun Trouble (Clampett/May 21/Porky 101) - 1938
 Porky the Fireman (Tashlin/Jun 4/GC 4:2) - 1938
 Katnip Kollege (Howard and Dalton/Jun 11/GC 2:4/PC 1:2)  - 1938
 Porky's Party (Clampett/Jun 25/GC 3:3) - 1938
 Have You Got Any Castles? (Tashlin/Jun 25/GC 2:4)  - 1938
 Porky's Spring Planting (Tashlin/Jul 25/PP101) - 1938
 Porky & Daffy (Clampett/Aug 6/PP101) - 1938
 Wholly Smoke (Tashlin/Aug 27/GC 5:4) - 1938
 Cracked Ice (Tashlin/Sep 10/GC 4:2) - 1938
 Porky in Wackyland (Clampett/Sep 24/GC 2:3/PC 2:1) - 1938
 Little Pancho Vanilla (Tashlin/Oct 8/GC 4:2)  - 1938
 Porky's Naughty Nephew (Clampett/Oct 15/PP101) - 1938
 Porky in Egypt (Clampett/Nov 5/GC 3:3/PC 2:1) - 1938
 You're an Education (Tashlin/Nov 5/GC 4:2)  - 1938
 The Night Watchman (Jones/Nov 19/GC 4:4) - 1938
 The Daffy Doc (Clampett/Nov 26/GC 5:3/EDD) - 1938
 Daffy Duck in Hollywood (Avery/Dec 3/GC 3:2) - 1938
 Porky the Gob (Hardaway & Dalton/Dec 17/PP101) - 1938
 The Mice Will Play (Avery/Dec 31/MC:2 - 1938
 The Lone Stranger and Porky (Clampett/Jan 7/PP101) - 1939
 It's an Ill Wind (Hardaway & Dalton/Jan 28/PP101) - 1939
 Porky's Tire Trouble (Clampett/Feb 18/PP101) - 1939
 Porky's Movie Mystery (Clampett/March 11/PP101) - 1939
 Prest-O Change-O (Jones/March 25/PC 2:2) - 1939
 Chicken Jitters (Clampett/Apr 1/PP101)
 Daffy Duck and the Dinosaur (Jones/Apr 22/GC 3:4) - 1939
 Porky and Teabiscuit (Hardaway and Dalton/Apr 22/GC 3:3/PP101) - 1939
 Thugs with Dirty Mugs (Avery/May 6/GC 3:2)  - 1939
 Kristopher Kolumbus Jr. (Clampett/May 13/PP101) - 1939
 Naughty but Mice (Jones/May 20/MC:1) - 1939
 Polar Pals (Clampett/Jun 3/GC 5:4/PP101) - 1939
 Scalp Trouble (Clampett/Jun 24/PP101) - 1939
 Old Glory (Jones/Jul 1/GC 2:3/PC 1:1/PP101)  - 1939
 Porky's Picnic (Clampett/Jul 15/PP101) - 1939
 Wise Quacks (Clampett/Aug 5/GC 5:4/PP101) - 1939
 Hare-um Scare-um (Hardaway/Aug 12/GC PC 2:2) - 1939
 Porky's Hotel (Clampett/Sep 2/PP101) - 1939
 Little Brother Rat (Jones/Sep 2/MC:1) - 1939
 Jeepers Creepers (Clampett/Sep 23/PP101) - 1939
 Naughty Neighors (Clampett/Oct 7/PP101) - 1939
 Pied Piper Porky (Clampett/Nov 4/PP101) - 1939
 Porky the Giant Killer (Hardaway & Dalton/Nov 18/PP101)
 Sniffles and the Bookworm (Jones/Dec 2/MC:1)  - 1939
 The Film Fan (Clampett/Dec 16/GC 3:2/PP101) - 1939
 Porky's Breakdowns (unknown GC 4:4/PP101) - 1939
 Porky's Last Stand (Clampett/Jan 6/PP101) - 1940
 Africa Squeaks (Clampett/Jan 27/PP101) - 1940
 Ali-Baba Bound (Clampett/Feb 10/PP101) - 1940
 Elmer's Candid Camera (Jones/Mar 2/GC 1:3/EBB/PC 2:2/BB80) - 1940
 Pilgrim Porky (Clampett/Mar 16/GC 5:4/PP101) - 1940
 Slap Happy Pappy (Clampett/Apr 13/PP101) - 1940
 The Bear's Tale (Avery/Apr 13/GC 5:2) - 1940
 Porky's Poor Fish (Clampett/Apr 27/GC 4:4/PP101) - 1940
 Sniffles Takes a Trip (Jones/May 11/GC 6:1s/MC:1) 1940
 You Ought to Be in Pictures (Freleng/May 18/GC 2:4/PC 2:1/PP101) - 1940
 A Gander at Mother Goose (Avery/May 25/GC 5:2) - 1940
 The Chewin' Bruin (Clampett/Jun 8/PP101) - 1940
 Tom Thumb in Trouble (Jones/Jun 8/GC 5:2)  - 1940
 Porky's Baseball Broadcast (Freleng/Jul 6/PP101)
 Little Blabbermouse (Freleng/Jul 6/MC:2  - 1940
 The Egg Collector (Jones/Jul 20/MC:1)  - 1940
 A Wild Hare (Avery/Jul 27/CG 3:2s, NR/GC 4:1s NR/EBB/PC 2:1/BB80)(a.k.a. The Wild Hare) - 1940
 Patient Porky (Clampett/Aug 24/GC 5:3/PP101) - 1940
 Calling Dr. Porky (Freleng/Sep 21/PP101)
 Prehistoric Porky (Clampett/Oct 12/GC 5:3/PP101) - 1940
 The Sour Puss (Clampett/Nov 2/GC 4:4/PP101) - 1940
 Bedtime for Sniffles (Jones/Nov 23/MC:1  - 1940
 Porky's Hired Hand (Freleng/Nov 30/PP101) - 1940
 The Timid Toreador (Clampett/Dec 21/PP101) - 1940
 Shop, Look, and Listen (Freleng/Dec 21/MC:2 - 1940
 Porky's Snooze Reel (Clampett/Jan 11/PP101) - 1940
 The Fighting 69½th (Freleng/Jan 18/GC 6:2s)  - 1941
 Sniffles Bells the Cat (Jones/Feb 1/MC:1  - 1941
 Tortoise Beats Hare (Avery/Mar 15/GC 2:1/WW/PC 2:2) - 1941
 Porky's Bear Facts (Freleng/March 29/PP101) - 1941
 Goofy Groceries (Clampett/Mar 29/GC 3:2)  - 1941
 Toy Trouble (Jones/Apr 12/MC:1)  - 1941
 Porky's Preview (Avery/Apr 19/GC 5:4/PP101) - 1941
 The Trial of Mister Wolf (Freleng/Apr 26/GC 5:2) - 1941
 Porky's Ant (Jones/May 10/PP101) - 1941
 Farm Frolics (Clampett/May 10/GC 5:3)  - 1941
 Hollywood Steps Out (Avery/May 24/GC 2:4/PC 2:2)  - 1941
 A Coy Decoy (Clampett/Jun 7/PP101) - 1941
 Hiawatha's Rabbit Hunt (Freleng/Jun 7/PC 3:1)
 Porky's Prize Pony (Jones/Jun 21/PP101) - 1941
 Meet John Doughboy (Clampett/Jul 5/GC 6:2/PP101) - 1941
 The Heckling Hare (Avery/Jul 5/GC 2:1/3:2) - 1941
 We, the Animals- Squeak (Clampett/Aug 9/PP101) - 1941
 The Henpecked Duck (Clampett/Aug 30/PP101) - 1941
 Notes to You (Freleng/Sep 20/PP101) - 1941
 The Brave Little Bat (Jones/Sep 27/MC:1) - 1941
 Robinson Crusoe Jr. (McCabe/Oct 25/PP101) - 1941
 Rookie Revue (Freleng/Oct 25/GC 6:2) - 1941
 Porky's Midnight Matinee (Jones/Nov 22/PP101) - 1941
 Rhapsody in Rivets (Freleng/Dec 6/PC 3:2) - 1941
 Wabbit Twouble (Clampett/Dec 20/GC 1:1/PC 2:2) - 1941
 Porky's Pooch (Clampett/Dec 27/GC 5:3/PP101) - 1941
 Porky's Pastry Pirates (Freleng/Jan 17/PP101) - 1942
 Who's Who in the Zoo (McCabe/Feb 14/PP101) - 1942
 Porky's Cafe (Jones/Feb 21/PP101) - 1942
 Conrad the Sailor (Jones/Feb 28/GC 4:4) - 1942
 Crazy Cruise (Avery and Clampett/Mar 14/GC 5:3) - 1942
 The Wabbit Who Came to Supper (Freleng/Mar 28/GC 3:1) - 1942
 Horton Hatches the Egg (Clampett/Apr 11/GC 6:4)  - 1942
 The Wacky Wabbit (Clampett/May 2/GC 5:3) - 1942
 The Draft Horse (Jones/May 9/GC 6:2) - 1942
 Lights Fantastic (Freleng/May 23/GC 6:4) - 1942
 Hold the Lion, Please (Jones/June 6/BB80)- 1942
 Bugs Bunny Gets the Boid (Clampett/Jul 11/GC 1:3/PC 2:2/BB80) - 1942
 Wacky Blackout (Clampett/Jul 11/GC 6:2) - 1942
 Foney Fables (Freleng/Aug 1/GC 5:2) - 1942
 The Ducktators (McCabe/Aug 1/GC 6:2) - 1942
 Eatin' on the Cuff or The Moth Who Came to Dinner (Clampett/Aug 22/GC 5:4) - 1942
 The Dover Boys at Pimento University or The Rivals of Roquefort Hall (Jones/Sep 10/GC 2:2/PC 1:2) - 1942
 The Hep Cat (Clampett/Oct 3/GC 2:4)  - 1942
 The Hare-Brained Hypnotist (Freleng/Oct 31/GC 2:1) - 1942
 A Tale of Two Kitties (Clampett/Nov 21/GC 5:3/PC 1:1)  - 1942
 My Favorite Duck (Jones/Dec 5/GC 4:2s/GC 6:1)  - 1942
 Case of the Missing Hare (Jones/Dec 12/GC 3:1) - 1942
 Point Rationing of Foods (Jones/Feb/GC 3:3s/PC 1:3s) - 1943
 Confusions of a Nutzy Spy (McCabe/Jan 23/GC 6:2/PP101) - 1943
 Pigs in a Polka (Freleng/Feb 2/GC 3:3)  - 1943
 Tortoise Wins by a Hare (Clampett/Feb 20/GC 1:3/PC 2:2) - 1943
 The Fifth-Column Mouse (Freleng/Mar 6/GC 6:2) - 1943
  To Duck or Not to Duck (Jones/Mar 6/GC 6:1) - 1943
 Hop and Go (McCabe/Mar 27/GC 6:2) - 1943
 Super-Rabbit (Jones/Apr 3/GC 3:4/WW/BB80) - 1943
 The Unbearable Bear (Jones/Apr 17/MC:1)  - 1943
 The Wise Quacking Duck (Clampett/May 1/GC 5:3/PC 2:1) - 1943
 Jack-Wabbit and the Beanstalk (Freleng/Jun 12/BB80) - 1943 
 The Aristo-Cat (Jones/Jun 19/GC 4:4/MC:2)  - 1943
 Coming Snafu (Jones/Jun/5:3s) - 1943
 Yankee Doodle Daffy (Freleng/Jul 3/GC 1:2) - 1943
 Wackiki Wabbit (Jones/Jul 3/GC 3:1) - 1943
 Porky Pig's Feat (Tashlin/Jul 17/GC 3:3/PC 3:2/PP101) - 1943
 Gripes (Freleng/Jul/GC 5:3s) - 1943
 Scrap Happy Daffy (Tashlin/Aug 21/GC 5:4/PC 3:2) - 1943
 Spies (Jones/Aug/GC 3:4s) - 1943
 A Corny Concerto (Clampett/Sep 25/GC 2:4/4:1/PC 3:1) - 1943
 The Goldbrick (Tashlin/Sep/GC 4:2s) - 1943
 Falling Hare (Clampett/Oct 30/GC 3:4/PC 3:1) - 1943
 The Home Front (Tashlin/Nov/GC 4:2s) - 1943
  Daffy - The Commando (Freleng/Nov 20/GC 6:2) - 1943
 An Itch in Time (Clampett/Dec 4/GC 3:4/PC 2:2)  - 1943
 Puss n' Booty (Tashlin/Dec 11/GC 4:2) - 1943
 Rumors (Freleng/Dec/GC 3:4s) - 1943
 Little Red Riding Rabbit (Freleng/Jan 4/GC 2:1/PC 3:1) - 1944
 What's Cookin' Doc? (Clampett/Jan 8/GC 4:1s NR/BB80) - 1944
 Tom Turk and Daffy (Jones/Feb 12/PP) - 1944
 Bugs Bunny and the Three Bears (Jones/Feb 26/GC 1:3/BB80) - 1944
 I Got Plenty of Mutton (Tashlin/Mar 11/GC 4:2) - 1944
 Snafuperman (Freleng/Mar/GC 3:4s) - 1944
 The Weakly Reporter (Jones/Mar 25/GC 6:2) - 1944
 Tick Tock Tuckered (Clampett/Apr 8/DD)  - 1944
 Swooner Crooner (Tashlin/May 6/GC 3:2/PC 3:2)  - 1944
  Russian Rhapsody (Clampett/May 20/GC 6:2/PC 2:2) - 1944
 Duck Soup to Nuts (Freleng/May 27/GC 2:3)  - 1944
 Hare Ribbin' (Clampett/Jun 24/GC 5:3/BB80) - 1944
 Hare Force (Freleng/Jul 22/GC 3:1) - 1944
 Censored (Tashlin/Jul/GC 4:2s) - 1944
 Hell-Bent for Election (Jones/Jul/PC 1:3s) - 1944
 Birdy and the Beast (Clampett/Aug 19/PC 2:1) - 1944
 Buckaroo Bugs (Clampett/Aug 26/GC 5:3/PC 2:1) - 1944
 Plane Daffy (Tashlin/Sep 16/GC 4:2/PC 3:2/EDD) - 1944
 Lost and Foundling (Jones/Sep 30/MC:1)  - 1944
 Booby Hatched (Tashlin/Oct 14/GC 4:2)  - 1944
 The Old Grey Hare (Clampett/Oct 28/GC 5:3/PC 1:1/EBB/BB80) - 1944
 The Stupid Cupid (Tashlin/Nov 25/GC 4:2/PC 3:2)  - 1944
 Stage Door Cartoon (Freleng/Dec 30/GC 2:4) - 1944
 Odor-able Kitty (Jones/Jan 6/GC 3:4/PLP)  - 1945
 Herr Meets Hare (Freleng/Jan 13/GC 6:2) - 1945
 Draftee Daffy (Clampett/Jan 27/GC 3:4/PC 3:2) - 1945
 Trap Happy Porky (Jones/Feb 24/MC:2 - 1945
 Life with Feathers (Freleng/March 24/PC 3:2) - 1945
 Hare Trigger (Freleng/May 5/GC 3:3s/6:1) - 1945
 A Gruesome Twosome (Clampett/Jun 9/GC 3:4/PC 3:2) - 1945
 Wagon Heels (Clampett/Jul 28/GC 5:3/PP) - 1945
 Hare Conditioned (Jones/Aug 11/GC 2:1) - 1945
 Fresh Airedale (Jones/Aug 25/GC 6:4)  - 1945
 The Bashful Buzzard (Clampett/Sep 5/GC 5:3/PC 2:2)  - 1945
 Hare Tonic (Jones/Nov 10/GC 3:1/PC 1:1) - 1945
 Nasty Quacks (Tashlin/Dec 1/DD/EDD/PC 3:2) - 1945
 The Return of Mr. Hook (1945/McKimson/GC 5:3s) - 1945
 The Good Egg (1945/Jones/GC 5:3s) - 1945
 Tokyo Woes (1945/Clampett/GC 5:3s) - 1945
 Book Revue (Clampett/Jan 5/GC 2:4/EDD/PC 2:1) (a.k.a. Book Review) - 1946
 Baseball Bugs (Freleng/Feb 2/GC 1:1/PC 1:1/EBB/BB80) - 1946
 Holiday for Shoestrings (Freleng/Feb 23/GC 5:2) - 1946
 Baby Bottleneck (Clampett/Mar 16/GC 2:3/PC 1:1) - 1946
 Hare Remover (Tashlin/Mar 23/GC 3:1) - 1946
 Hollywood Canine Canteen (McKimson/Apr 20/GC 6:2) - 1946
 Hush My Mouse (Jones/May 4/MC:1) - 1946
 Hair-Raising Hare (Jones/May 25/GC 1:3/GC 3:3/GC 4:2/EBB/PC 3:1/BB80) - 1946
 Kitty Kornered (Clampett/Jun 8/GC 2:3/PC 1:1) - 1946
 Hollywood Daffy (Freleng/Jun 22/GC 5:1) - 1946
 Acrobatty Bunny (McKimson/Jun 29/GC 3:1) - 1946
 The Great Piggy Bank Robbery (Clampett/Jul 20/GC 2:3/PC 1:1/EDD) - 1946
 Bacall to Arms (Clampett/Aug 3/GC 5:3) - 1946
 Walky Talky Hawky (McKimson/Aug 31/GC 3:4/GC 4:2)  - 1946
 Racketeer Rabbit (Freleng/Sep 14/BB80) - 1946
 The Big Snooze (Clampett/Oct 5/GC 2:1/GC 3:2) - 1946
 Mouse Menace (Davis/Nov 2/PP)  - 1946
 Rhapsody Rabbit (Freleng/Nov 9/GC 2:4/GC 4:2) - 1946
 Roughly Squeaking (Jones/Nov 23/MC:2)  - 1946
 One Meat Brawl (McKimson/Jan 18/PP)  - 1947
 What Makes Daffy Duck (Davis/Feb 14/PC 2:1) - 1947
 Scent-imental Over You (Jones/Mar 8/PLP)  - 1947
 A Hare Grows in Manhattan (Freleng/Mar 23/GC 3:1) - 1947
 Birth of a Notion (McKimson/Apr 12/6:1) - 1947
 Tweetie Pie (Freleng/May 3/GC 2:3/PC 1:1/FF)  - 1947
 Rabbit Transit (Freleng/May 10/GC 2:1/PC 2:2) - 1947
 Easter Yeggs (McKimson/Jun 28/GC 3:1) - 1947
 Crowing Pains (McKimson/Jul 12/GC 6:1) - 1947
 A Pest in the House (Jones/Aug 3/GC 5:1/PC 1:1) - 1947
 House Hunting Mice (Jones/Sep 6/MC:2)  - 1947
 Slick Hare (Freleng/Nov 1/GC 2:1) - 1947
 A Horse Fly Fleas (McKimson/Dec 13/PC 2:2)  - 1947
 Gorilla My Dreams (McKimson/Jan 3/GC 2:1/WW) - 1948
 Daffy Duck Slept Here (McKimson/Mar 6/GC 3:3) - 1948
 Back Alley Oproar (Freleng/Mar 27/GC 2:4/PC 2:1) - 1948
 I Taw a Putty Tat (Freleng/Apr 2/GC 4:1s NR)  - 1948
 Rabbit Punch (Jones/Apr 10/GC 3:4) - 1948
 Hop, Look and Listen (McKimson/Apr 17/MM)
 Buccaneer Bunny (Freleng/May 8/GC 5:1/PC 1:1) - 1948
 Bugs Bunny Rides Again (Freleng/Jun 12/GC 2:1/BB80) - 1948
 The Up-Standing Sitter (McKimson/Jul 3/GC 5:1) - 1948
 Haredevil Hare (Jones/Jul 24/GC 1:3/PC 1:2/BB80) - 1948
 You Were Never Duckier (Jones/Aug 7/GC 5:1) - 1948
 Dough Ray Me-ow (Davis/Aug 14/GC 4:4/PC 2:2) - 1948
 Hot Cross Bunny (McKimson/Aug 21/BB80) - 1948
 The Pest That Came to Dinner (Davis/Sep 11/PP)  - 1948
 Hare Splitter (Freleng/Sep 25/BB80) - 1948
 Odor of the Day (Davis/Oct 2/PLP) - 1948
 The Foghorn Leghorn (McKimson/Oct 9/GC 1:4/PC 2:1) - 1948
 Daffy Dilly (Jones/Oct 30/DD)  - 1948
 Kit for Cat (Freleng/Nov 6/GC 1:4) - 1948
 The Stupor Salesman (Davis/Nov 20/GC 5:1) - 1948
 Riff Raffy Daffy (Davis/Nov 27/PP) - 1948
 My Bunny Lies over the Sea (Jones/Dec 4/GC 1:1)  - 1948
 Scaredy Cat (Jones/Dec 18/GC 1:2/PC 1:1) - 1948
 Wise Quackers (Freleng/Jan 1/DD) - 1949
 Hare Do (Freleng/Jan 15/GC 3:1) - 1949
 Awful Orphan (Jones/Jan 29/GC 1:3)  - 1949
 Porky Chops (Davis/Feb 12/GC 1:2/PC 1:1) - 1949
 Mississippi Hare (Jones/Feb 26/GC 4:1) - 1949
 Paying the Piper (McKimson/Mar 12/GC 5:2)  - 1949
 Daffy Duck Hunt (McKimson/Mar 26/GC 1:4)  - 1949
 Rebel Rabbit (McKimson/Apr 9/GC 3:1)  - 1949
 Mouse Wreckers (Jones/Apr 23/GC 2:2/MC:2)  - 1949
 High Diving Hare (Freleng/Apr 30/GC 1:1/WW)  - 1949
 Curtain Razor (Freleng/May 21/PP) - 1949
 Bowery Bugs (Davis/Jun 4/GC 3:1/WW)  - 1949
 Mouse Mazurka (Freleng/Jun 11/MC:2)  - 1949
 Long-Haired Hare (Jones/Jun 25/GC 1:1/WW/PC 2:1) - 1949
 Knights Must Fall (Freleng/Jul 16/BB80) - 1949
 Bad Ol' Putty Tat (Freleng/Jul 23/GC 2:3/FF)  - 1949
 The Grey Hounded Hare (McKimson/Aug 6/GC 4:1)  - 1949
 Often an Orphan (Jones/Aug 13/GC 6:1) - 1949
 The Windblown Hare (McKimson/Aug 27/GC 3:3) - 1949
 Dough for the Do-Do  (Freleng/Sep 2/GC 1:2)  - 1949
 Fast and Furry-ous (Jones/Sep 16/GC 1:3/PC 1:1)  - 1949
 Frigid Hare (Jones/Oct 7/GC 1:3) - 1949
 Swallow the Leader (McKimson/Oct 14/GC 4:4)  - 1949
 Bye, Bye Bluebeard (Davis/Oct 21/GC 3:3)  - 1949
 For Scent-imental Reasons (Jones/Nov 12/GC 1:3/PC 1:1/PLP)  - 1949
 Hippety Hopper (McKimson/Nov 19/GC 6:1s/MM)  - 1949
 Bear Feat (Jones/Dec 10/GC 6:1) - 1949
 Rabbit Hood (Jones/Dec 24/GC 4:1)  - 1949
 A Ham in a Role (McKimson/Dec 31/GC 6:1) - 1949
 So Much for So Little (Jones/GC 2:4s/PC 1:3s) - 1949
 Home Tweet Home (Freleng/Jan 14/PC 2:1) - 1950
 Hurdy-Gurdy Hare (McKimson/Jan 21/GC 4:1)  - 1950
 Boobs in the Woods (McKimson/Jan 28/GC 1:2/PP)  - 1950
 Mutiny on the Bunny (Freleng/Feb 11/BB) - 1950
 The Lion's Busy (Freleng/Feb 18/PC 2:2) - 1950
 The Scarlet Pumpernickel (Jones/Mar 4/GC 1:2/PC 1:1/EDD)  - 1950
 Homeless Hare (Jones/Mar 11/GC 3:1)  - 1950
 Strife with Father (McKimson/Apr 1/PC 2:2) - 1950
 The Hypo-Chondri-Cat (Jones/Apr 15/GC 1:3/MC:2)  - 1950
 Big House Bunny (Freleng/Apr 22/GC 1:1) - 1950
 An Egg Scramble (McKimson/May 27/GC 3:3)  - 1950
 What's Up Doc? (McKimson/Jun 17/GC 1:1/BB80) - 1950
 All Abir-r-r-d! (Freleng/Jun 24/GC 2:3/FF)  - 1950
 8 Ball Bunny (Jones/Jul 8/GC 4:1/PC 1:1/EBB/BB80)  - 1950
 It's Hummer Time (McKimson/Jul 22/GC 6:4) - 1950
 Golden Yeggs (Freleng/Aug 5/GC 1:2)  - 1950
 Hillbilly Hare (McKimson/Aug 12/GC 3:1) - 1950
 Dog Gone South (Jones/Aug 26/GC 6:1) - 1950
 The Ducksters (Jones/Sep 2/GC 1:2)  - 1950
 Bunker Hill Bunny (Freleng/Sep 23/GC 1:4) - 1950
 Canary Row (Freleng/Oct 7/GC 1:4/FF)  - 1950
 Pop 'im Pop! (McKimson/Oct 28/MM) - 1950
 Bushy Hare (McKimson/Nov 18/BB) - 1950
 Dog Collared (McKimson/Dec 2/PP)  - 1950
 Rabbit of Seville (Jones/Dec 16/GC 1:1/PC 1:1/WW/EBB) - 1950
 Hare We Go (McKimson/Jan 6/BB) - 1951
 Canned Feud (Freleng/Feb 3/GC 1:4/PC 2:1)  - 1951
 Rabbit Every Monday (Freleng/Feb 10/BB80) - 1951
 Putty Tat Trouble (Freleng/Feb 24/GC 1:4/FF)  - 1951
 Corn Plastered (McKimson/Mar 3/PP)  - 1951
 Bunny Hugged (Jones/Mar 10/GC 2:1)  - 1951
 Scent-imental Romeo (Jones/Mar 24/PLP/PC 2:1)  - 1951
 The Fair-Haired Hare (Freleng/Apr 14/BB80)
 Early to Bet (McKimson/May 12/GC 1:4)  - 1951
 Rabbit Fire (Jones/May 19/GC 1:2/WW/EBB/PC 2:2/BB80)  - 1951
 Room and Bird (Freleng/Jun 2/GC 2:3/FF)  - 1951
 Chow Hound (Jones/Jun 16/GC 6:4/PC 1:2) - 1951
 French Rarebit (McKimson/Jun 30/GC 2:1)  - 1951
 The Wearing of the Grin (Jones/Jul 28/GC 1:2)  - 1951
 His Hare Raising Tale (Freleng/Aug 11/BB80) - 1951
 Cheese Chasers (Jones/Aug 28/GC 2:2/MC:2)  - 1951
 Lovelorn Leghorn (McKimson/Sep 8/PC 1:1) - 1951
 Tweety's S.O.S. (Freleng/Sep 22/GC 1:4/FF)  - 1951
 Ballot Box Bunny (Freleng/Oct 6/GC 1:1/WW)  - 1951
 A Bear for Punishment (Jones/Oct 20/GC 2:2)  - 1951
 Sleepy Time Possum (McKimson/Nov 3/GC 6:4) - 1951
 Drip-Along Daffy (Jones/Nov 17/GC 1:2/PC 2:2)  - 1951
 Big Top Bunny (McKimson/Dec 12/GC 1:1/WW)  - 1951
 Tweet Tweet Tweety (Freleng/Dec 15/GC 2:3/FF)  - 1951
 The Prize Pest (McKimson/Dec 22/DD) -  1951
 Who's Kitten Who? (McKimson/Jan 5/MM) - 1952
 Operation: Rabbit (Jones/Jan 19/GC 4:1) - 1952
 Feed the Kitty (Jones/Feb 2/GC 1:3/PC 1:2)  - 1952
 Gift Wrapped (Freleng/Feb 16/GC 2:3/FF/PC 2:1)  - 1952
 Foxy by Proxy (Freleng/Feb 23/BB) - 1952
 Thumb Fun (McKimson/Mar 1/PP)  - 1952
 14 Carrot Rabbit (Freleng/Feb 16/GC 5:1) - 1952
 Little Beau Pepé (Jones/Mar 29/PLP) -  - 1952
 Kiddin' The Kitten (McKimson/Apr 5/GC 4:4)  - 1952
 Water, Water Every Hare (Jones/Apr 19/GC 1:1) - 1952
 Little Red Rodent Hood (Freleng/May 3/GC 5:2/PC 2:1) - 1952
 Beep, Beep (Jones/May 24/GC 2:2/PC 1:1)  - 1952
 Orange Blossoms for Violet (Jones/May 24/GC 2:4s/PC 1:3s) - 1952
 The Hasty Hare (Jones/Jun 7/PC 1:2) - 1952
 Ain't She Tweet (Freleng/Jun 21/GC 2:3/FF)  - 1952
 The Turn-Tale Wolf (McKimson/Jun 28/GC 5:2) - 1952
 Oily Hare (McKimson/Jul 26/GC 5:1) - 1952
 Hoppy-Go-Lucky (McKimson/Aug 9/MM) - 1952
 Going! Going! Gosh! (Jones/Aug 23/GC 2:2/PC 2:1) - 1952
 A Bird in a Guilty Cage (Freleng/Aug 30/GC 2:3)  - 1952
 Mouse Warming (Jones/Sep 8/MC:2) - 1952
 Rabbit Seasoning (Jones/Sep 20/GC 1:1/WW/PC 2:2) - 1952
 Tree for Two (Freleng/Oct 18/PC 3:2)
 The Super Snooper (McKimson/Nov 11/GC 5:1) - 1952
 Rabbit's Kin (McKimson/Nov 15/GC 1:1/WW) - 1952
 Fool Coverage (McKimson/Dec 13/PP)  - 1952
 Hare Lift (Freleng/Dec 20/BB80)
 Don't Give Up the Sheep (Jones/Jan 3/GC 1:3) - 1953
 Snow Business (Freleng/Jan 17/GC 2:3/Looney Tunes Super Stars' Tweety & Sylvester: Feline Fwenzy) - 1953
 Forward March Hare (Jones/Feb 4/GC 4:1) - 1953
 Kiss Me Cat (Jones/Feb 21/GC 4:4/PC 1:2) - 1953
 Duck Amuck (Jones/Feb 28/GC 1:2/PC 1:1/EDD) - 1953
 Upswept Hare (McKimson/Mar 14/BB80)
 A Peck o' Trouble (McKimson/Mar 28/GC 4:4)  - 1953
 Southern Fried Rabbit (Freleng/May 2/GC 4:1) - 1953
 Ant Pasted (Freleng/May 9/PP) - 1953
 Much Ado About Nutting (Jones/May 23/GC 6:4) - 1953
 Hare Trimmed (Freleng/Jun 20/BB) - 1953
 Wild Over You (Jones/Jul 11/PLP) - 1953
 Duck Dodgers in the 24½th Century (Jones/Jul 25/GC 1:2/PC 1:2/EDD) - 1953
 Bully for Bugs (Jones/Aug 8/GC 1:1/WW/PC 3:1) - 1953
 Cat-Tails for Two  (McKimson/Aug 29/GC 4:3)  - 1953
 Zipping Along (Jones/Sep 19/GC 2:2/PC 2:1) - 1953
 Duck! Rabbit, Duck! (Jones/Oct 3/GC 3:1/PC 2:2) - 1953
 Cat's A-weigh (McKimson/Nov 28/MM) - 1953
 Robot Rabbit (Freleng/Dec 12/BB80) - 1953
 Punch Trunk (Jones/Dec 19/GC 6:4) - 1953
 Dog Pounded (Freleng/Jan 2/PLP/PC 3:2) 1954
 Captain Hareblower (Freleng/Jan 16/BB80)
 Feline Frame-Up (Jones/Feb 13/PC 1:2) - 1954
 Wild Wife (McKimson/Feb 20/GC 6:4) - 1954
 No Barking  (Jones/Feb 27/GC 3:4)  - 1954
 Bugs and Thugs (Freleng/Mar 2/GC 1:4) - 1954
 The Cat's Bah (Jones/Mar 20/PLP) - 1954
 Design for Leaving (McKimson/Mar 27/DD) - 1954
 Bell Hoppy (McKimson/Apr 17/MM) - 1954
 No Parking Hare (McKimson/May 1/BB80)
 Claws for Alarm (Jones/May 22/GC 3:3) - 1954
 Little Boy Boo (McKimson/Jun 5/FL) - 1954
 Devil May Hare (McKimson/Jun 19/GC 1:4/PC 1:2) - 1954
 The Oily American (McKimson/Jul 10/GC 6:4) - 1954
 Bewitched Bunny (Jones/Jul 24/GC 5:2/PC 1:2) - 1954
 Satan's Waitin' (Freleng/Aug 7/GC 6:1/FF) - 1954
 Stop! Look! And Hasten! (Jones/Aug 14/GC 2:2) - 1954
 Yankee Doodle Bugs (Freleng/Aug 28/BB80) - 1954
 Gone Batty (McKimson/Sep 4/PP)  - 1954
 Goo Goo Goliath (Freleng/Sep 18/GC 6:4) - 1954
 By Word of Mouse (Freleng/Oct 2/GC 6:2) - 1954
 From A to Z-Z-Z-Z  (Jones/Oct 16/PC 1:2)  - 1954
 Lumber Jack-Rabbit (Jones/Nov 13/BB/BB80) - 1954
 My Little Duckaroo (Jones/Nov 27/GC 6:1/EDD/PC 2:2) - 1954
 Baby Buggy Bunny (Jones/Dec 18/GC 2:1/BB80) - 1954
 Pizzicato Pussycat (Freleng/Jan 1/GC 4:4) - 1955
 All Fowled Up (McKimson/Feb 19/FL) - 1955
 Stork Naked (Freleng/Feb 26/DD) - 1955
 Lighthouse Mouse (McKimson/Mar 12/MM) - 1955
 Sahara Hare (Freleng/Mar 26/GC 4:1) - 1955
 Sandy Claws (Freleng/Apr 2/PC 3:2) - 1955
 The Hole Idea (McKimson/Apr 16/GC 6:4) - 1955
 Ready, Set, Zoom! (Jones/Apr 30/GC 2:2) - 1955
 Hare Brush (Freleng/May 7/BB80) - 1955
 Past Perfumance (Jones/May 21/PLP) - 1955
 Rabbit Rampage (Jones/Jun 11/GC 6:1s) - 1955
 Lumber Jerks (Freleng/Jun 25/GC 1:4) - 1955
 This Is a Life? (Freleng/Jul 9/DD/BB80) - 1955
 Jumpin' Jupiter (Jones/Aug 6/GC 6:1) - 1955
 Hyde and Hare (Freleng/Aug 27/GC 2:1) - 1955
 Dime to Retire (McKimson/Sep 3/DD) - 1955
 Speedy Gonzales (Freleng/Sep 17/GC 1:4/PC 1:1) - 1955
 Knight-mare Hare (Jones/Oct 1/GC 4:1) - 1955
 Two Scent's Worth (Jones/Oct 15/PLP) - 1955
 Red Riding Hoodwinked (Freleng/Oct 29/GC 5:2) - 1955
 Roman Legion-Hare (Freleng/Nov 12/GC 4:1) - 1955
 Heir-Conditioned (Freleng/Nov 26/GC 6:2) - 1955
 Guided Muscle (Jones/Dec 10/GC 2:2) - 1955
 One Froggy Evening (Jones/Dec 31/GC 2:4/PC 1:2) - 1955
 A Hitch in Time (Jones/PC 1:3s) - 1955
 Bugs' Bonnets (Jones/Jan 14/GC 5:1) - 1956
 Too Hop to Handle (McKimson/Jan 28/MM) - 1956
 Weasel Stop (McKimson/Jan 28/FL)  - 1956
 The High and the Flighty (McKimson/Feb 18/PC 2:1) - 1956
 Broom-Stick Bunny (Jones/Feb 25/GC 2:1/PC 1:2/WW) - 1956
 Rocket Squad (Jones/Mar 10/GC 3:3) - 1956
  Heaven Scent (Jones/Mar 31/GC 6:1/PLP) - 1956
 Rabbitson Crusoe (Freleng/Apr 28/BB80) - 1956
 Gee Whiz-z-z-z-z-z-z (Jones/May 5/GC 2:2) - 1956
 The Unexpected Pest (McKimson/Jun 2/GC 4:4) - 1956
 Napoleon Bunny-Part (Freleng/Jun 16/BB/BB80) - 1956
 Stupor Duck (McKimson/Jul 17/GC 5:1) - 1956
 Barbary Coast Bunny (Jones/Jul 21/GC 4:1/PC 2:2) - 1956
 Rocket-bye Baby (Jones/Aug 4/GC 6:4/PC 2:2) - 1956
 Half-Fare Hare (McKimson/Aug 25/BB80) - 1956  
 Raw! Raw! Rooster! (McKimson/Aug 25/GC 6:1) - 1956
 The Slap-Hoppy Mouse (McKimson/Sep 1/MM) - 1956
 A Star Is Bored (Freleng/Sep 15/GC 5:1/EDD) - 1956
 Deduce, You Say! (Jones/Sep 29/GC 1:2/EDD/PC 2:1) - 1956
 Yankee Dood It (Freleng/Oct 13/GC 6:2) - 1956
 Wideo Wabbit (McKimson/Oct 27/GC 3:2) - 1956
 There They Go-Go-Go! (Jones/Nov 10/GC 2:2) - 1956
 Two Crows from Tacos (Freleng/Nov 24/FL) - 1956
 The Honey-Mousers (McKimson/Dec 8/GC 3:2) - 1956
 To Hare Is Human (Jones/Dec 15/GC 4:1) - 1956
90 Day Wondering (Jones/GC 4:3s/PC 1:3s) - 1956
 Three Little Bops (Freleng/Jan 5/GC 2:4/PC 1:2) - 1957
 Scrambled Aches (Jones/Jan 26/GC 2:2) - 1957
 Ali Baba Bunny (Jones/Feb 9/GC 5:1/EDD/PC 2:1) - 1957
 Go Fly a Kit (Jones/Feb 23/GC 4:4) - 1957
 Tweety and the Beanstalk (Freleng/May 16/GC 5:2/FF) - 1957
 Bedevilled Rabbit (McKimson/Apr 13/BB/PC 1:2) - 1957
 Boyhood Daze (Jones/Apr 20/GC 6:1s/PC 1:2) - 1957
 Cheese It, the Cat! (McKimson/May 4/FL) - 1957
 Fox-Terror (McKimson/May 11/FL)  - 1957
 Piker's Peak (Freleng/May 25/BB80) - 1957
 Steal Wool (Jones/Jun 8/GC 3:4) - 1957
 What's Opera, Doc? (Jones/Jul 6/GC 2:4/PC 1:1/EBB) - 1957
 Tabasco Road (McKimson/Jul 20/GC 4:3/PC 2:1)  - 1957
 Birds Anonymous (Freleng/Aug 10/GC 3:4/FF)  - 1957
 Ducking the Devil (McKimson/Aug 17/DD/PC 1:2) - 1957
 Bugsy and Mugsy (Freleng/Aug 31/BB80) - 1957
 Zoom and Bored (Jones/Sep 14/GC 2:2) - 1957
 Touché and Go (Jones/Oct 12/PLP) - 1957
 Show Biz Bugs (Freleng/Nov 2/GC 2:4/EBB/PC 2:1) - 1957
 Mouse-Taken Identity (McKimson/Nov 16/MC:2/MM) - 1957
 Gonzales' Tamales (Freleng/Nov 30/GC 3:4) - 1957
 Rabbit Romeo (McKimson/Dec 14/GC 4:1) - 1957Drafty, Isn't It? (Jones/GC 4:3s/PC 1:3s) - 1957
 Tortilla Flaps (McKimson/Jan 18/GC 4:3) - 1958
 Hare-Less Wolf (Freleng/Feb 1/BB80) - 1958
 Robin Hood Daffy (Jones/Mar 8/GC 3:3/PC 1:1/EDD) - 1958
 Hare-Way to the Stars (Mar 29/PC 1:2) - 1958
 Whoa, Be-Gone! (Jones/Apr 12/GC 2:2) - 1958
 Now, Hare This (McKimson/May 31/BB80) - 1958
 Knighty Knight Bugs (Freleng/Aug 23/GC 4:1/PC 3:1/EBB/BB80) - 1958
 Weasel While You Work (McKimson/Sept 6/FL) - 1958
  Hook, Line and Stinker (Jones/Oct 11/GC 6:1) - 1958
 Gopher Broke (McKimson/Nov 15/FL) - 1958
 Cat Feud (Jones/Dec 20/GC 4:4) - 1958
 Baton Bunny (Jones and Levitow/Jan 10/GC 1:3/WW) - 1959
 Mouse-Placed Kitten (McKimson/Jan 24/FL) - 1959
 The Mouse That Jack Built (McKimson/Apr 4/GC 3:2) - 1959
 Hare-Abian Nights (Harris/Feb 28/BB80) - 1959
 Apes of Wrath (Freleng/Apr 18/BB) - 1959
 A Mutt in a Rut (McKimson/May 23/FL) - 1959
 Backwoods Bunny (McKimson/Jun 13/BB80) - 1959
 Really Scent (Levitow/Jun 27/PLP) - 1959
 Mexicali Shmoes (Freleng/Jul 4/GC 4:3/PC 2:1) - 1959
 Wild and Woolly Hare (Freleng/Aug 1/BB80) - 1959
 Cat's Paw (McKimson/Aug 15/MM) - 1959
 Here Today, Gone Tamale (Freleng/Aug 29/GC 4:3) - 1959
 Bonanza Bunny (McKimson/Sep 5/BB80) - 1959
 A Broken Leghorn (McKimson/Sept 26/GC 1:4) - 1959
 A Witch's Tangled Hare (Jones and Levitow/PC 1:2) - 1959
 People Are Bunny (McKimson/Dec 19/DD/BB80) - 1959
 West of the Pesos (McKimson/Jan 23/GC 4:3) - 1960
 Wild Wild World (McKimson/Feb 27/GC 6:4) - 1960
 Goldimouse and the Three Cats (Freleng/Mar 15/GC 5:2) - 1960
 Person to Bunny (Freleng/Apr 2/DD/BB80) - 1960
 Who Scent You? (Jones/Apr 23/PLP) - 1960
 Rabbit's Feat (Jones/Jun 4/BB80)
 Crockett-Doodle-Do (McKimson/Jun 25/FL) - 1960
 Mouse and Garden (Freleng/Jul 16/GC 4:4) - 1960
 Mice Follies (McKimson/August 20/MC:2) - 1960
 From Hare to Heir (Freleng/Sept 3/BB/BB80) - 1960
 Dog Gone People (McKimson/Nov 12/PP) - 1960
 High Note (Jones/Dec 3/PC 3:2) - 1960
 Lighter Than Hare (Freleng/Dec 17/BB) - 1960
 Cannery Woe (McKimson/Jan 7/GC 4:3) - 1961
 Hoppy Daze (McKimson/Feb 11/MM) - 1961
 Strangled Eggs (McKimson/Mar 18/FL) - 1961
 Birds of a Father (McKimson/Mar
 The Abominable Snow Rabbit (Jones/May 20/GC 5:1) - 1961
 A Scent of the Matterhorn (Jones/Jun 24/PLP) - 1961
 Compressed Hare (Jones/Jul 29/BB80) - 1961
 The Pied Piper of Guadalupe (Freleng/Aug 19/GC 4:3) - 1961
 Prince Violent (Freleng/Sep 2/BB80) - 1961
 Daffy's Inn Trouble (McKimson/Sep 23/DD) - 1961
 Beep Prepared (Jones/Nov 11/PC 3:2) - 1961
 The Last Hungry Cat (Freleng/Dec 2/GC 3:2/FF) - 1961
 Nelly's Folly (Jones/Dec 30/PC 3:2) - 1961
 Fish and Slips (Jones/Mar 10/MM) - 1962
 Crows' Feat (Freleng and Pratt/Apr 21/FL) - 1962
 Mexican Boarders (Freleng/May 12/GC 4:3) - 1962
Adventures of the Road Runner (Jones/May/GC 2:2s) - 1962
 Bill of Hare (McKimson/Jun 9/PC 1:2) - 1962
 Louvre Come Back to Me! (Jones and Noble/Aug 18/PLP) - 1962
 Honey's Money (Freleng/Sep 1/PC 3:1)
 Shishkabugs (Freleng/Dec 8/BB80) - 1962
 Martian Through Georgia (Jones and Levitow/Dec 29/GC 6:4) - 1962
Philbert (Three's a Crowd) (Donner/Apr 1/GC 3:4s) - 1963
 The Million Hare (McKimson/Apr 6/BB/BB80) - 1963
 Now Hear This (Jones/Apr 27/GC 6:4) - 1963
 Banty Raids (McKimson/Jun 29/FL) - 1963
 Chili Weather (Freleng/Aug 17/GC 4:3) - 1963
 Mad as a Mars Hare (Jones/Oct 19/BB/PC 1:2) - 1963
 Claws in the Lease (McKimson/Nov 9/MM) - 1963
 Transylvania 6-5000 (Jones/Nov 30/GC 5:1) - 1963
 To Beep or Not to Beep (Jones/Dec 28/GC 3:4) - 1963
 A Message to Gracias (McKimson/Feb 8/GC 4:3) - 1964
 Bartholomew Versus the Wheel (McKimson/Feb 29/GC 6:4) - 1964
 Freudy Cat (McKimson/Mar 14/MM) - 1964
 Dr. Devil and Mr. Hare (McKimson/Mar 28/BB/PC 1:2) - 1964
 Nuts and Volts (Freleng/Apr 25/GC 4:3) - 1964
 The Iceman Ducketh (Monroe/May 16/DD) - 1964
 False Hare (McKimson/Jul 18/BB/BB80) - 1964
 Señorella and the Glass Huarache (Pratt/Aug 1/GC 5:2) - 1964
 Pancho's Hideaway (Freleng/Oct 24/GC 4:3) - 1964
 It's Nice to Have a Mouse Around the House (Freleng/Jan 16/MC:2) - 1965
 The Wild Chase (Freleng/Feb 27/GC 4:3) - 1965
 Suppressed Duck (McKimson/Jun 26/DD) - 1965
 Corn on the Cop (Spector/Jul 24/PP) - 1965
 Boulder Wham! (Larriva/Oct 9/SH) - 1965
 Hairied and Hurried (Larriva/Nov 13/SH) - 1965
 Highway Runnery (Larriva/Dec 11/SH) - 1965
 Chaser on the Rocks (Larriva/Dec 25/SH) - 1965
 Shot and Bothered (Larriva/Jan 8/SH) - 1966
 Out and Out Rout (Larriva/Jan 29/SH) - 1966
 The Solid Tin Coyote (Larriva/Feb 19/SH) - 1966
 Clippety Clobbered (Larriva/Mar 12/SH) - 1966
 A-Haunting We Will Go (McKimson/Apr 26/GC 4:3/PC 1:2) - 1966
 Sugar and Spies (McKimson/Nov 5/SH) - 1966
 Merlin the Magic Mouse (Lovy/Nov 18/MC:2) - 1967
Norman Normal (Lovy/Feb 3/GC 6:4) - 1968
The Door (Mundie/Jun 1/PC 1:3s) - 1968
 Bunny and Claude (We Rob Carrot Patches) (McKimson/Nov 23/PP) - 1968
 The Great Carrot Train Robbery (McKimson/Jan 25/PP) - 1969
 The Duxorcist (Ford and Lennon/Nov 20/EDD) - 1987
 The Night of the Living Duck (Ford and Lennon/Sept 23/EDD) - 1988
 (Blooper) Bunny (Ford and Lennon/Feb/GC 1:1s/BB80) - 1991
 Daffy & Porky in the William Tell Overture (Haskett and Fossati/Apr 17/GC 4:2s) (NT) - 1991
 Invasion of the Bunny Snatchers (EBB)- 1992
 Chariots of Fur (Jones/Dec 21/SH) - 1994 (NT)
 Carrotblanca (McCarthy/EBB) - 1995
 Another Froggy Evening (Jones/Jan/PC 1:3s) - 1995
 Superior Duck (Jones/PC 1:1/EDD) - 1996
 From Hare to Eternity (Jones/PC 1:3s) - 1997
 Father of the Bird (Fossati/PC 1:3s) - 1997
 Little Go Beep (Brandt/Dec 30/SH) - 2000
 Daffy Duck for President (Brandt and Cervone/Nov 2/GC 2:3s/EDD) (NT) - 2003
 Attack of the Drones (Moore/EDD) (NT) - 2003
 Hare and Loathing in Las Vegas (Kopp and Shin/EBB) - 2003
 The Whizzard of Ow (Haaland/Nov 1/SH) - 2003
 Museum Scream (Povenmire/PC 1:3s) - 2003
 Coyote Falls (O' Callaghan/Jul 20/SH) - 2010
 Fur of Flying (O' Callaghan/Sep 24/SH) - 2010
 Rabid Rider (O' Callaghan/Dec 17/SH) - 2010

See also
 Looney Tunes and Merrie Melodies filmography
 Looney Tunes and Merrie Melodies filmography (1929–1939)
 Looney Tunes and Merrie Melodies filmography (1940–1949)
 Looney Tunes and Merrie Melodies filmography (1950–1959)
 Looney Tunes and Merrie Melodies filmography (1960–1969)
 Looney Tunes and Merrie Melodies filmography (1970–present and miscellaneous)
 The Golden Age of Looney Tunes
 Looney Tunes Super Stars - the successor series of DVDs dedicated to one star of the series per DVD
 Looney Tunes Platinum Collection Blu-ray successor

References

Looney Tunes home video releases